Roger Stewart Nichols (born September 17, 1940) is an American composer and songwriter.  He is a multi-instrumentalist who plays violin, guitar, bass, and piano.

Career
Nichols co-wrote many songs with lyricists Paul Williams, Tony Asher, and Bill Lane.

Asher and Nichols co-wrote several songs on Nichols' debut album Roger Nichols and the Small Circle of Friends (A&M Records, 1968) which was produced by Tommy LiPuma, engineered by Bruce Botnick, and featured session contributions from Van Dyke Parks, Randy Newman and Lenny Waronker. Although the album was not a big seller, A&M co-owner Herb Alpert recommended that Nichols be hired by A&M publishing as a staff songwriter, and it was during this period that he was introduced to Paul Williams.

Nichols' collaborations with Paul Williams include "We've Only Just Begun" (performed by The Carpenters), which was originally written for a Crocker Bank commercial. They were commissioned to write a jingle after a bank executive heard Nichols' album, and it was composed in a matter of hours on the last day before the deadline. The commercial (sung by Williams) was heard on TV by Richard Carpenter, who believed it had hit potential. According to the documentary Close to You: Remembering The Carpenters, Williams reported that his label-mate Richard called him up and asked if there was a complete song. Williams replied `We had an additional verse and a bridge, but if we didn't I'd have lied through my teeth. This was a chance to get a Carpenters record which was a big deal in those days. Richard and Karen gave our songs a life.'

Richard's group The Carpenters subsequently recorded a version, which became a major hit in late 1970. It was nominated for a Grammy Award for Song of the Year, was included on BMI's million performances list and received an award for selling a million copies of sheet music. The song was also covered by Curtis Mayfield among many others.

"Times of Your Life", written with Lane and performed by Paul Anka, reached number one on the Adult Contemporary chart in January 1976.

Another Nichols-Williams song, "Out in the Country" by Three Dog Night (later covered by R.E.M.), reached the Top Ten. Six months later, "Rainy Days and Mondays" was another gold record by The Carpenters and Nichols' third gold record in a single year.

Other hits were The Carpenters' "I Won't Last a Day Without You", Art Garfunkel's "Travelin' Boy" (covered by Rumer) and "I Never Had It So Good" (covered by Barbra Streisand).  He also scored the theme song from Hart to Hart with a lyric by Lane.

Nichols released a Japan-only CD in 1995 called Roger Nichols and a Circle of Friends – Be Gentle With My Heart, featuring vocalist Sheila O'Connell-Roussell, on which he recorded some of his best-known tunes, including "We've Only Just Begun", "I Won't Last a Day Without You", and "Rainy Days and Mondays" (which featured Williams on guest vocals).

He also released an album in 2007 with the original Small Circle of Friends, Full Circle, which brought together the group to cover many of Nichols hits for other bands, including "Out in the Country" and "Let Me Be the One" as well as other tunes penned by Nichols. 2008 saw an upgraded release of Full Circle, issued by Steve Stanley's Now Sounds label. This version also contained five  previously-unreleased, 1960s-era demo recordings.

Personal life
In addition to his extensive musical career, Nichols also is a successful jeweler.

Roger's brother, Ted Nichols, was also a noted composer who briefly served as musical director for the Hanna-Barbera cartoon studio.

Discography

Albums
 Roger Nichols and the Small Circle of Friends (1968)
 Roger Nichols and a Circle of Friends – Be Gentle With My Heart (1995)
 Roger Nichols and the Small Circle of Friends – Full Circle (2007)
 Roger Nichols and the Small Circle of Friends – Full Circle (2008; Now Sounds edition with five extra tracks)
 ''Roger Nichols and the Small Circle of Friends – My Heart is Home (2012)

Singles

References

External links
 
 

1940 births
Living people
20th-century American composers
20th-century American male musicians
21st-century American composers
21st-century American male musicians
A&M Records artists
American male composers
American male songwriters
American multi-instrumentalists
Musicians from Missoula, Montana
People from Oakland, California
Songwriters from California
Songwriters from Montana